Augustus Page Saunders FRS (1 March 1801 – 21 July 1878), was a British Headmaster of Charterhouse School and Dean of Peterborough Cathedral.

Life

A son of Robert Saunders, of Lewisham, and his wife, Margaret Keble, he was educated at Charterhouse School and Christ Church, Oxford.

Saunders was ordained a priest in 1825. In 1832 he was appointed as vicar of Ravensthorpe, Northamptonshire, resigning in 1835. He had also been made a domestic chaplain to Richard Bagot, Bishop of Oxford, in 1832. He was awarded the degree of Doctor of Divinity in 1842.

He served as Headmaster of Charterhouse School from 1832 to 1853, and was then Dean of Peterborough from 1853 until his death. In 1872 he declined the Deanery of Winchester.

In 1833 he was elected a Fellow of the Royal Society

Memorials

A brass plaque was erected on a column in the south-east section of Peterborough Cathedral, close to the burial place of Mary, Queen of Scots.

Family

He married Emma Frances Walford in 1838 and had 10 children.

References

1801 births
1878 deaths
People educated at Charterhouse School
Doctors of Divinity
Headmasters of Charterhouse School
Deans of Peterborough
Fellows of the Royal Society